The United Kingdom of Great Britain and Northern Ireland, competing under the name Great Britain first participated at the European Youth Olympic Festival at the 1991 Summer Festival and has earned medals at both summer and winter festivals.

Medal tables

Medals by Summer Youth Olympic Festival

Medals by Winter Youth Olympic Festival

See also
Great Britain at the Olympics
Great Britain at the Youth Olympics
Great Britain at the Paralympics
Great Britain at the European Games

References
 

European Youth Olympic Festival
Nations at the European Youth Olympic Festival
European Youth Olympic Festival